Howard Luong is an electrical engineer at the Hong Kong University of Science and Technology. He was named a Fellow of the Institute of Electrical and Electronics Engineers (IEEE) in 2014 for his contributions to CMOS radio frequency transceiver design.

References

Fellow Members of the IEEE
Living people
Hong Kong engineers
Year of birth missing (living people)
Place of birth missing (living people)